You're a Revhead is the second compilation album by Australian recording artist Adam Brand, featuring 17 "revhead" songs.  The album was released on 27 May 2011 and came with a bonus DVD featuring 8 video clips. You're a Revhead peaked at number 39 on the ARIA Charts.

Track listing

Charts

Weekly charts

Year-end charts

Release history

References

2011 compilation albums
Compilation albums by Australian artists
Adam Brand (musician) albums